Chief Sunday Bolorunduro Awoniyi, CON (April 30, 1932 – November 28, 2007) was a Northern Nigerian Yoruba politician and tribal aristocrat as the Aro of Mopa in Kogi State, formerly Kabba Province. Known as little Sardauna, Awoniyi was a founder of the People's Democratic Party from which he was expelled and then reinstated, Awoniyi was also chairman of the Arewa Consultative Forum (ACF); a pan Northern Nigerian organisation.

Family and education
Awoniyi was born in what is now the Mopa-Muro Local Government Area of Kogi State to Pa Solomon Iwalaye and Dorcas Omoboja. A Baptist, he attended the First Baptist Church in Ileteju, Mopa. He began his education at Baptist Day School in Mopa from 1938 to 1944, moving on to Holy Trinity School in Lokoja from 1945 to 1946, and Provincial Middle School in Okene from 1947 to 1949. He attended the Nigeria College of Arts, Science and Technology (now Ahmadu Bello University) from 1951 until 1956, University College (now the University of Ibadan) from 1956 to 1959, and the Imperial Defence College (now the Royal College of Defence Studies) from 1970 to 1971.

Awoniyi had two wives, Florence Ebun Awoniyi and Benedicta Omowunmi Awoniyi, and eleven children; among his children is Abayomi, an architect and politician.

Political career

First Republic
Awoniyi's first political appointment was as a District Officer for the British colonial administration (he was one of few Northern Nigerians to hold the post, most being reserved to Britons). After independence in 1960, he held several posts in the Northern Regional Government including that of Secretary to the Executive Council, where he worked with Sardauna Ahmadu Bello, Premier of Northern Nigeria. Awoniyi often held up the assassinated premier as an example of good governance, and was known as "Sardauna Keremi", or "little Sardauna".

Third Republic
During the Third Republic, Awoniyi was a member of the National Republican Convention (NRC), and was elected to the Senate of Nigeria for the Kogi West district.

Fourth Republic
Awoniyi was one of the founding members of the People's Democratic Party. He attempted to become chairman in 1999, but was unsuccessful. The party under Chairman Barnabas Gemade expelled him and six others in 2001 for "anti party activities", but reinstated them later that year.

Ever identifying himself as a Northern Nigerian, he later became Chairman of the Arewa Consultative Forum (ACF), a pan Northern Nigerian political organization detested by many Southern Nigerians; questioned about his acceptance of this position, he said he was "brought up in my own part of the world to act well our part wherever we may find ourselves." He held the chairmanship until his death.

Awoniyi opposed the Third Term Agenda proposed by supporters of President Olusegun Obasanjo in favor of his re-election, and was attacked at his Abuja house on March 12, 2006 during the debate. In April 2006, he wrote an open letter to Obasanjo, saying "I beg of you, for your own good and for our country's good, make a simple announcement to say that you are not interested in a Third Term and that you plan to go back to Otta in 2007."

Death
On November 18, 2007, while being driven from Abuja to Kaduna, Awoniyi's car flipped over. He was taken to the National Hospital in Abuja and then flown to London, where he died on November 28.

On December 11, 2007, a one-minute silence honoring him was observed in the Senate. His funeral was held at Mopa on December 15, 2007, and was attended by former Presidents Yakubu Gowon, Ibrahim Babangida, and Abdulsalami Abubakar, and Vice President Goodluck Jonathan, who represented President Umaru Yar'Adua.

References

External links

Yoruba politicians
Nigerian Baptists
Kogi State politicians
Ahmadu Bello University alumni
Members of the Senate (Nigeria)
1932 births
2007 deaths
Peoples Democratic Party (Nigeria) politicians
National Republican Convention politicians
20th-century Baptists